Omran Ahed al-Zoubi (27 September 1959 in Damascus, Syria – 6 July 2018 in Damascus, Syria) was the Minister of Information in the Government of Syria from 23 June 2012 until July 2016. He died from a heart attack on 6 July 2018.

References

21st-century Syrian politicians
1959 births
2018 deaths
Arab Socialist Ba'ath Party – Syria Region politicians
Damascus University alumni
Politicians from Damascus
People of the Syrian civil war
Syrian ministers of information